Bendito Entre Las Mujeres is the first solo album by lead guitarist of Latin rock band Maná, Sergio Vallín. The album was released on September 22, 2009. On this album which he combines his signature guitar chops with the voices of some of the greatest female singers that includes Spaniards Ana Torroja (of the trio Mecano), Rosana, Natalia Jiménez (of La 5ª Estación), Paulina Rubio, Joy Huerta (of Jesse & Joy), Ely Guerra, Raquel del Rosario (of El Sueño de Morfeo), María José and Brazilian star Ivete Sangalo.

The title is a pun on bendita entre las mujeres, which is said in praise of the Virgin Mary.

Track listing

Personnel 
Sergio Vallín – guitars, chorus
Jorginho Luiz *From Brazil – drums
Fernando Vallín – bass guitar
Jeff Babko – keyboards
Luis Conte – percussion
Chorus: Alih Jey, Karla Vallín & Sebastian Krys
Choir of Flamenco for: "Que Pasa Tío" : Macarena Rodriguez
Mariachi: Mariachi Divas de Cindy Shea

External links
 Official website
 Info from Amazon.com

2009 albums
Albums produced by Sebastian Krys